The 1981–82 CHL season was the 19th season of the Central Hockey League, a North American minor professional league. Nine teams participated in the regular season, and the Indianapolis Checkers won the league title.

Regular season

Playoffs

Awards

External links
 Statistics on hockeydb.com

CPHL
Central Professional Hockey League seasons